Wakhan, or "the Wakhan" (also spelt Vakhan; Persian and , Vâxân and Wāxān respectively; , Vaxon), is a rugged, mountainous part of the Pamir, Hindu Kush and Karakoram regions of Afghanistan. Wakhan District is a district in Badakshan Province.

Geography

The Wakhan is located in the extreme north-east of Afghanistan. It contains the headwaters of the Amu Darya (Oxus) River, and was an ancient corridor for travellers from the Tarim Basin to Badakshan. The geographic position of Wakhan between China, India, and Bactria allowed it to play a major role in trade in the ancient world.

Until 1883, the Wakhan included the whole valley of the Panj River and the Pamir River, as well as the upper flow of the Panj River known as the Wakhan River.<ref>[http://www.juldu.com/Pamir/2%20-%20Significance%20of%20Geopolitical%20Issues%20(Eng).pdf Hermann Kreutzmann (2005): The Significance of Geopolitical Issues for Development of Mountainous Areas of Central Asia] Map at p.12</ref> An 1873 agreement between UK and Russia split the Wakhan by delimiting spheres of influence for the two countries at the Panj and Pamir rivers. Since then, the name Wakhan is now generally used to refer to the Afghan area south of the two rivers. The northern part of the historic Wakhan is now part of the Gorno-Badakhshan Autonomous Province in Tajikistan.

The only road into the Wakhan is a rough track from Ishkashim past Qila-e Panja to Sarhad-e Broghil. Paths lead from the end of the road to the Wakhjir Pass, a mountain pass leading to China which is closed to travellers.

The western part of the Wakhan, between Ishkashim and Qila-e Panja, is known as Lower Wakhan, which includes the valley of the Panj River. The valleys of the Wakhan River, the Pamir River and their tributaries, and the terrain between, are known as Upper Wakhan.

The eastern extremity of Upper Wakhan is known as the Pamir Knot, the area where the Himalayas, Tian Shan, Karakoram, Kunlun, and Hindu Kush ranges meet. West of the Pamir Knot is the Little Pamir, a broad U-shaped grassy valley 100 km long and 10 km wide, which contains Chaqmaqtin Lake, the headwaters of the Aksu or Murghab River. At the eastern end of the Little Pamir is the Tegermansu Valley, from where the closed Tegermansu Pass (4,827 m) leads to China. The Great Pamir or Big Pamir, a 60 km long valley south of Zorkol lake, drained by the Pamir River, lies to the northwest of the Little Pamir.

The mountain range that divides the two Pamirs is known as the Nicholas Range. West of the Nicholas Range, between the Great Pamir and the lower valley of the Wakhan River, is the Wakhan Range, which culminates in the Koh-e Pamir (6,320 m).

The roads in the region have small shrines to Ismaili Muslim pirs and are adorned with "special stones and curled ibex and sheep horns", which are symbols of purity in the Zoroastrian faiths, once present in the region before the arrival of Islam.

 Wakhan Corridor 

The Wakhan is connected to Tashkurgan Tajik County, China, by a long, narrow strip called the Wakhan Corridor, which separates the Gorno-Badakhshan region of Tajikistan from Khyber Pakhtunkhwa in Pakistan and Gilgit-Baltistan.

The Wakhan River flows through the corridor from the east to Qila-e Panja where it joins the Pamir River to become the Panj River which then forms the border.

In the south the corridor is bordered by the high mountains of the Hindu Kush, crossed by the Broghol pass, the Irshad Pass and the disused Dilisang Pass to Pakistan.

History

Historically the Wakhan has been an important region for thousands of years as it is where the western and eastern portions of Central Asia meet.

 Ancient History 
Western Wakhan (休密 Xiumi) was conquered in the early part of the 1st century CE by Kujula Kadphises, the first "Great Kushan," and was one of the five xihou or principalities that formed the nucleus of the original Kushan kingdom. Wakhan was administered by the Kushan indirectly through semi-independent rulers who oversaw trade on the Buddhist Route of the Silk Road.

 Wakhan Mirdom 

Until 1883 Wakhan was a principality on both sides of the Panj and Pamir Rivers, ruled by a hereditary ruler (mir) with his capital at Qila-e Panja. It was normally a tributary to Badakhshan but in the 1750s when the Qing conquered the Dzungar Khanate they also ended up conquering Wakhan and Shughnan. The Khanate of Kokand eventually took Wakhan and Shughnan from the Qing by the 1830s.

 Conquest by Afghanistan 
Agreements between Britain and Russia in 1873 and between Britain and Afghanistan in 1893 effectively split the historic area of Wakhan by making the Panj and Pamir Rivers the border between Afghanistan and the Russian Empire. On its south side, the Durand Line agreement of 1893 marked the boundary between British India and Afghanistan. This left a narrow strip of land as a buffer between the two empires. In the 1880s (1880-1895), under pressure from Britain, Abdur Rahman Khan, the Emir of Afghanistan, imposed Afghan rule on the Wakhan. The last Mir of Wakhan, Ali Mardan Khan fled to Chitral, where he was allotted land in Ishkoman Valley.

 Modern History 
In 1949, when Mao Zedong completed the Communist takeover of China, the borders were permanently closed, sealing off the 2,000-year-old caravan route and turning the corridor into a cul-de-sac. When the Soviets invaded Afghanistan in December 1979, they occupied the Wakhan and built strong military posts at Sarhad-e Broghil and elsewhere. To facilitate access they built a bridge across the Pamir River at Prip, near Gaz Khan. However, the area did not see fighting.

In 2010 the Wakhan was reported to be peaceful and unaffected by the war in the rest of Afghanistan.

Demographics
Wakhan is sparsely populated. The total population is estimated at about 10,600. Wakhi and Kyrgyz are the major ethnic groups of Wakhan. Most of its inhabitants speak the Vakhi or Wakhi language (x̌ik zik), and belong to an ethnic group known as Vakhi or Wakhi. Nomadic Kyrgyz herders live at the higher altitudes.

According to a 2003 report by the United Nations Environment Programme and Food and Agriculture Organization, the population of Wakhan suffers from lack of education, poverty, ill health, food insecurity and opium addiction.

Wakhi

The Wakhi population of Wakhan was 9,444 in 2003. Almost all of them adhere to the Shia Ismaili faith and some of them speak Wakhi language. Wakhi people also inhabit several areas adjacent to the Wakhan in Tajikistan, Pakistan and China.

The Wakhi practice agriculture in the river valleys, and herd animals in the summer pastures at higher elevations.

The dominant sect of Islam in the region is Ismaili, much milder than the strict form of Islam generally practiced in the country. In Ishkashim, the city at the western mouth of the Wakhan, stricter observance is demanded. The area has been long neglected by the central government of Afghanistan. People are poor, many being traditional pastoralists living in yurts and lacking basic services. Non-governmental organizations such as the Aga Khan Development Network foundation have taken an interest in the area. The Central Asia Institute, founded by Greg Mortenson, has built 11 schools in the region.

There is a trickle of tourists who engage in trekking and mountaineering.

Alastair Leithead of BBC News 24 on 26 December 2007, presented a half-hour feature about Wakhan, focusing particularly on the work of the expatriate British doctor Alexander Duncan, which provided a significant piece of extended media reporting from this inaccessible area. He has also covered the Pamir Festival in the area.

Kyrgyz
The Kyrgyz population of Wakhan was 1,130 in 2003, all in the eastern part of Wakhan. The Kyrgyz are Sunni Hanafi Muslims.

The suppression of the 1916 rebellion against Russian rule in Central Asia caused many Kyrgyz to later migrate to China and Afghanistan. Most Kyrgyz refugees settled in Wakhan region of Afghanistan.

Until 1978, the northeastern portion of Wakhan (the Great Pamir and the Little Pamir) was home to about 3,000-5,000 ethnic Kyrgyz. In 1978 almost all the Kyrgyz inhabitants fled to Pakistan in the aftermath of the Saur Revolution. They requested 5,000 visas from the United States Consulate in Peshawar for resettlement in Alaska (a region that shares a similar climate and temperature with the Wakhan Corridor). Their request was denied. In the meantime, the heat and the unsanitary conditions of the refugee camp were killing the Kyrgyz refugees at an alarming rate. Turkey, which was then under the military coup rule of General Kenan Evren, stepped in, and resettled the entire group in the Lake Van region of Turkey in 1982. The village of Ulupamir (or "Great Pamir" in Kyrgyz) in Erciş on Lake Van was given to them, and more than 5,000 of them still reside today. The documentary film "37 Uses for a Dead Sheep – the story of the Pamir Kirghiz" was based on the life of these Kyrgyz/Kirgiz in their new home.

Kyrgyz from Wakhan region of Afghanistan moved to Pakistan in the 1970s. Nearly 1,100 of them were accepted by Turkey to settle in Ulupamir (or "Great Pamir" in Kyrgyz), their resettlement village in Van Province.

Some Kyrgyz returned to the Wakhan in October 1979, following the Soviet occupation of Afghanistan.

Tourism

In recent years the Wakhan has become a destination for adventurous trekkers, and several tour companies offer trips to the area. BBC correspondent John Simpson has recommended the area as a place to take a wonderful, and relatively safe, holiday. Kate Humble, a BBC television presenter, reports that the area is beautiful and the people friendly. The entire Wakhan was designated as the protected Wakhan National Park in 2014.

Popular culture
The Wakhan plays a large role in Greg Mortenson's book, Stones into Schools. This book tells the story of the building of a school in the Kyrgyz village of Bozai Gumbaz. The factual accuracy of this account is strongly disputed in Jon Krakauer's ebook Three Cups of Deceit.

Footnotes

References
 Gordon, T. E. 1876. The Roof of the World: Being the Narrative of a Journey over the high plateau of Tibet to the Russian Frontier and the Oxus sources on Pamir. Edinburgh. Edmonston and Douglas. Reprint: Ch’eng Wen Publishing Company. Taipei. 1971.
 Kokaisl, Petr. The lifestyles and changes in culture of Afghan Kyrgyz and Kyrgyz in Kyrgyzstan. Asian Ethnicity. 2013, vol. 14, issue 4, pages 407–433. . Online
 Shahrani, M. Nazif. (1979) The Kirghiz and Wakhi of Afghanistan: Adaptation to Closed Frontiers and War. 
 Munshi Abdur Rahim. Journey to Badakhshan with Report on Wakhan and Badakhshan. 1885.  
 Stein, Aurel M. 1921a. Serindia: Detailed report of explorations in Central Asia and westernmost China, 5 vols. London & Oxford. Clarendon Press. Reprint: Delhi. Motilal Banarsidass. 1980. 
 Stein Aurel M. 1921. "A Chinese expedition across the Pamirs and Hindukush, A.D. 747". Indian Antiquary 1923. From: www.pears2.lib.Ohio-state.edu/ FULLTEXT/TR-ENG/aurel.htm. Last modified 24 June 1997. Retrieved 13 January 1999.
 Stein Aurel M. 1928. Innermost Asia: Detailed report of explorations in Central Asia, Kan-su and Eastern Iran, 5 vols. Clarendon Press. Reprint: New Delhi. Cosmo Publications. 1981.
 Stein Aurel M. 1929. On Alexander's Track to the Indus: Personal Narrative of Explorations on the North-west Frontier of India. London. Reprint, New York, Benjamin Blom, 1972.

External links

 Photo Essay on Afghan Kyrgyz in Wakhan and on the group Kyrgyz that migrated to Turkey from the Wakhan
 Aga Khan Development Network: Wakhan and the Afghan Pamir (2010)
 Juldu.com Photos and Online guide to trekking in the Wakhan and Afghan Pamir
 Wakhan Development Partnership A project working to improve the lives of the people of Wakhan since 2003
 Wakhan Corridor  Photos from Afghan Wakhan Corridor
 Little Pamir  Photos of Life of Kirghiz in Afghanistan's Little Pamir
 Photos From Afghanistan: Natural Beauty, Not War – slideshow by NPR  Ride Report of two Polish motorcyclists who rode to Wakhan from Poland in 2009
Wong, Edward. "In Icy Tip of Afghanistan, War Seems Remote." The New York Times''. 27 October 2010.
 Portfolio of images from summer 2010 trek through the Afghan Pamir by Zygmunt Korytkowski, photographer and traveller. 
 Photos from the Wakhan Corridor Albums mainly from the Eastern part of Wakhan (Big and Little Pamir) inhabited by Kirghiz nomads.
 Polish Climbing Expedition "Afghanistan 2010"
 Climbing in the Wakhan Corridor
 Caravanistan.com Wakhan corridor

 
Regions of Afghanistan
Geography of Tajikistan
Sites along the Silk Road